Antonio Cascos (born 21 December 1963) is a Spanish cross-country skier. He competed in the men's 10 kilometre classical event at the 1992 Winter Olympics.

References

1963 births
Living people
Spanish male cross-country skiers
Olympic cross-country skiers of Spain
Cross-country skiers at the 1992 Winter Olympics
Place of birth missing (living people)